List of Indian composers, arranged in alphabetical order:

Film Composers

 Abhimann Roy
 Aby Tom Cyriac 
 Ajay–Atul
 Alphons Joseph
 Amaal Mallik
 Amit Trivedi
 Anand–Milind
 Anil Biswas
 Anirudh Ravichander
 Ankit Tiwari
 Ananda Shankar
 Anu Malik
 Anupam Roy
 A. R. Rahman
 Arjun Janya
 Asif Panjwani
 Bennet Veetraag
 Pandit Bhajan Sopori
 Bhupen Hazarika
 Bombay Ravi
 Chitragupta Shrivastava
 C. Ramchandra
 D. Imman
 Daboo Malik
 Damodar Raao
 Datta Naik
 Debojyoti Mishra
 Deva
 Devi Sri Prasad
 Freddie Mercury
 G. Devarajan
 G. V. Prakash Kumar
 Gangai Amaran
 Gopi Sunder
 Gurukiran
 Gulzar
 Hamsalekha
 Harris Jayaraj
 Himesh Reshammiya
 Honey Singh
 Hridaynath Mangeshkar
 Ilaiyaraaja
 Ismail Darbar
 Jaidev
 Jatin–Lalit
 Jim Ankan Deka
 Jeet Ganguly
 Johnson
 Karthik
 Karthik Raja
 Karthikeya Murthy
 Kamal Heer
 Kartik Seshadri
 Louis Banks
 Madan Mohan
 Manoj George
 Mani Sharma
 Meet Bros
 Mickey J Meyer
 Mithoon
 M. Jayachandran
 M. M. Keeravani
 M.S Baburaj
 Laxmikant–Pyarelal
 L. Subramaniam
 Kalyanji-Anandji
 Naushad Ali
 Nadeem-Shravan
 Nitin Dubey
 Nityanand Haldipur
 Oni-Adil
 O. P. Nayyar
 Pankaj Kumar Mullick
 Parichay (singer)
 Pawandeep Rajan
 Pritam Chakraborty
 Raam Laxman
 Ram Sampath
 Rahul Dev Burman
 Rahul Raj
 Raichand Boral
 Pandit Ravi Shankar
 Ravindra Jain
 Raveendran
 Remo Fernandes
 Roop Kumar Rathod
 Rohan-Rohan
 Raju Singh
 Sachin Dev Burman
 Sajid–Wajid
 Sachin–Jigar
 Salil Chowdhury
 Salim–Sulaiman
 Sandeep Khurana
 Sandeep Chowta
 Sangtar
 Shankar–Ehsaan–Loy
 Shantanu Moitra
 Shashwat Sachdev
 Shankar–Jaikishan
 Srinivas Khale
 Shubha Mudgal
 Sneha Khanwalkar
 Sohail Sen
 S.P.Balasubrahmanyam
 Sudhir Phadke
 Tanishk Bagchi
 Thaman Sai
 Vidyasagar
 Vijay Antony
 Vishal Bhardwaj
 Vishal–Shekhar
 Vishal Mishra
 Vishvesh Parmar
 Viswanathan–Ramamoorthy
 Yuvan Shankar Raja
 Zakir Hussain
 Zubeen Garg
 Vikram Montrose

Carnatic Composers

 Annamacharya
 Chembai Vaidyanatha Bhagavatar
 Ilayaraja
 Irayimman Thampi
 L. Subramaniam
 Lalgudi Jayaraman
 M Balamuralikrishna
 Muthuswami Dikshitar
 Purandara Dasa
 Subbaraya Shastri
 Swathi Thirunal
 Syama Shastri
 Thyagaraja
 Periasamy Thooran
 Jayadeva
 VVS Murari

Western Classical/Art music Composers (of Indian descent)

 Clarence Barlow
 Ilayaraja
 L. Subramaniam
 Sandeep Bhagwati
 Reena Esmail
 Vijay Iyer
 Shirish Korde
 Rudresh Mahanthappa
 Naresh Sohal
 Param Vir

Lists of composers by nationality
Composers
Composers